Mark Simmons  is a retired senior UK police officer.

Simmons joined the Metropolitan Police as a constable on 6 September 1982, becoming Borough Commander for Tower Hamlets and in February 2012 receiving the Queen's Police Medal. In March 2016 he was the subject of an Independent Police Complaints Commission inquiry He was Deputy Assistant Commissioner and Head of Local Policing until December 2018, when he was appointed Assistant Commissioner of the Metropolitan Police's Frontline Policing.

He announced his retirement in February 2020 before postponing it due to the COVID-19 pandemic. He finally retired in August 2020.

Honours

References

Assistant Commissioners of Police of the Metropolis
Living people
Year of birth missing (living people)
20th-century births
English recipients of the Queen's Police Medal
Metropolitan Police recipients of the Queen's Police Medal